Avery Claflin (January 21, 1898 - January 9, 1979) was an American composer, although he studied law and business, later pursuing a career in banking. He served as president for the French American Banking Corp.

He took music courses at Harvard University.  Among Claflin's teachers was the French composer Erik Satie.  Claflin was a business associate of Charles Ives. Although he worked in business, Claflin found time to compose music and be active in various musical organizations.  He retired in 1954, and he composed many of his works after this date.

Among his works is a madrigal, Lament for April 15, which uses as its text instructions for an Internal Revenue Service tax form.  This choral work received its premiere in 1955 at Tanglewood, in Berkshire County, Massachusetts.  Every year on April 15, Karl Haas, musician, conductor, and radio host, played a recording of this composition on his public radio program, Adventures in Good Music.

External links
 Avery Claflin scores (the composer's manuscripts) in the Music Division of The New York Public Library for the Performing Arts.
 Article at Time magazine on Claflin's Lament for April 15.
 Avery Claflin: Piano Concerto (1956-1957) -- Orchestra: Gísli Magnússon, piano with the Iceland Symphony Orchestra, William Strickland conductor

1898 births
1979 deaths
Harvard University alumni
American male classical composers
American classical composers
Avery
American bankers
20th-century classical composers
20th-century American businesspeople
20th-century American composers
20th-century American male musicians